Events in the year 1370 in Norway.

Incumbents
Monarch: Haakon VI Magnusson

Events

Arts and literature

Births
Olav IV of Norway, king (died 1387).

Deaths

References

Norway